The Sparganothini are a tribe of tortrix moths.

Genera
Aesiocopa
Amorbia
Amorbimorpha
Anchicremna
Circanota
Coelostathma
Lambertiodes
Niasoma
paramorbia
Paramorbia
Rhynchophyllis
Sparganocosma
Sparganopseustis
Sparganothina
Sparganothis
Sparganothoides
†Spatalistiforma
Syllonoma
Synalocha
Synnoma

Unplaced species
Capua arrecta Meyrick, 1917

References

 , 2013: A food plant specialist in Sparganothini: A new genus and species from Costa Rica (Lepidoptera, Tortricidae). Zookeys 303: 53-63. Abstract and full article: .
 , 1985: Discovery of two new species and genera of shaggy Tortricids related to Synnoma and Niasoma (Tortricidiae: Sparganothini). Journal of Research on the Lepidoptera 24 (1): 61-71. Full article: .
 , 2010: Tortricidae (Lepidoptera) from Peru. Acta Zoologica Cracoviensia 53B (1-2): 73-159. . Full article: .

External links
 Markku Savela's Lepidoptera and some other life forms: Preliminary genus list. Version of 2005-SEP-14. Retrieved 2007-MAY-29.

 
Moth tribes